`Ayn al-`Arab District is a district of Aleppo Governorate in northern Syria. The administrative centre is the city of Kobani.
   
The district fills the northeastern section of the governorate, and its northern boundary is along the Syria–Turkey border.

At the 2004 census, the district had a population of 192,513.

Sub-districts
The district of Ayn Al-Arab is divided into four sub-districts or nawāḥī (population as of 2004):

Al-Jalabiyah Subdistrict was separated from Sarrin Subdistrict in 2009.

References

 
Districts of Aleppo Governorate